Qaleh Qafeh-ye Pain (also Romanized as Qal‘eh Qāfeh-ye Pā’īn) is a village in Qaleh Qafeh Rural District, in the Central District of Minudasht County, Golestan Province, Iran. At the 2006 census, its population was 930 in 233 families.

References 

Populated places in Minudasht County